Sakon Nakhon is one of Thailand's seventy-six provinces (changwat) lies in upper northeastern Thailand also called Isan. Neighboring provinces are (from north clockwise) Nong Khai, Bueng Kan, Nakhon Phanom, Mukdahan, Kalasin, and Udon Thani. The capital is Sakon Nakhon.

Toponymy
The word sakon originates from the Sanskrit word sakala (Devanagari:  सकल) meaning 'entire', 'whole', or 'total', and the word nakhon from Sanskrit nagara (Devanagari:  नगर) meaning 'town' or 'city'. Hence the name of the province literally means "city of cities".

Geography
The province is on the Khorat Plateau, not far from the Mekong. The Nong Han lake, the biggest natural lake of northeast Thailand, near the city of Sakon Nakhon, is a popular resort. The Phu Phan Mountains delimit the province to the south.

National parks
There are three national parks, along with four other national parks, make up region 10 (Udon Thani) of Thailand's protected areas. 
 Phu Pha Yon National Park, 
 Phu Phan National Park, 
 Phu Pha Lek National Park,

History
The history of Sakon Nakhon dates back to about three thousand years. Local legend says that Mueang Nong Han Luang, or presently Sakhon Nakhon, was built in the 11th century when the Khmer ruled this region. When the Khmer lost its power, the town was under the rule of Lan Xang or Lao Kingdom. It was renamed into "Mueang Chiang Mai Nong Han". When the town was under Siam, it was renamed again into "Sakhon Thawapi" in 1830, during King Rama III's reign, it was renamed "Sakon Nakhon".

Phu Phan Mountains in the area of Sakon Nakhon, especially Sawang Daen Din district, formerly a stronghold of the Communist Party of Thailand.

Ethnic group
The Ethnic group of Sakon Nakhon are Chinese and Vietnamese with Tai Dam as well as Nyaw.

Symbols
The provincial seal shows the Phrathat Choeng Chum, a Lao-style chedi built during the Ayutthaya period over a Khmer-style prang.

The provincial tree is the banaba or Queen's Crape Myrtle (Lagerstroemia speciosa). Black sharkminnow (Labeo chrysophekadion) is the provincial fish.

Economy
Fish and rice are two of the major products of the region.

Kho Khun Pon Yang Kham is branded as Thailand's best-quality beef, produced by Pon Yang Kham Breeding Cooperatives, which was incorporated in 1980 in Ban Pon Yang Kham in Mueang Sankhon Nakhon. It has created a great reputation for the province. Kho Khun Pon Yang Kham is regarded as "Thai Kobe beef".

Transportation

Rail
Sakon Nakhon does not have a train service yet. People who want to travel to Sakon Nakhon by train can get off at Udon Thani Railway Station in neighboring province Udon Thani. Then take a local bus to Sakon Nakhon, the distance is approximately 156 km.

Roads
Route 22 leads north to Udon Thani, 160 km distant, and east to Nakhon Phanom (91 km) and the border with Laos. Route 223 leads south to That Phanom (76 km). Route 213 leads 
west to Kalasin (131 km).

Air
There is a regional airport, Sakon Nakhon Airport, on the north side of the city.

Health 
Sakon Nakhon's main hospital is Sakon Nakhon Hospital, operated by the Ministry of Public Health.

Administrative divisions

Provincial government

The province is divided into 18 districts (amphoes). The districts are further divided into 125 subdistricts (tambons) and 1,323 villages (mubans).

Local government
As of 26 November 2019 there are: one Sakon Nakhon Provincial Administration Organisation and 66 municipal (thesaban) areas in the province. Sakon Nakhon has city (thesaban nakhon) status. Further 65 subdistrict municipalities (thesaban tambon). The non-municipal areas are administered by 74 Subdistrict Administrative Organisations - SAO (ongkan borihan suan tambon).

Human achievement index 2017

Since 2003, United Nations Development Programme (UNDP) in Thailand has tracked progress on human development at sub-national level using the Human achievement index (HAI), a composite index covering all the eight key areas of human development. National Economic and Social Development Board (NESDB) has taken over this task since 2017.

Important places
Sakon Nakhon is a location of many important places, apart from Nong Han and Phu Phan Mountains, include
Phu Phan National Park
Phu Pha Yon National Park 
Phu Pha Lek National Park
Nam Un Dam
Wat Phra That Choeng Chum
Phu Phan Rajanivet Palace

Events and festivals
Prasat Pueng Procession: held during the 12th-15th day of waxing moon in October to mark the end of Buddhist Lent.  On the night of 13thday, people will join hands in decoration Prasat Pueng (wax castle) at Ming Mueang Field. The 14thday, wax castel from various temples will join the procession, roaming the municipality to Wat Phra That Choeng Chum. Isan people believe that the wax will welcome Buddha who comes back from the heaven to help all creatures on earth.
Regatta: held synchronically with the Prasat Pueng Procession, the ancient regatta will be held at Phang Thong Pond or Tha Nang Ap, Ban Tha Wat.
Tha Rae Star Procession: is a tradition unique to the world and has been held annually during Christmas Eve since 1982, the celebrations and procession will take place at Ban Tha Rae, home to Thailand's largest Roman Catholic community, in Mueang Sakhon Nakhon.

Notable people

Born in Sakhon Nakhon
Dusit Chalermsan: professional footballer, football coach
Suree Sukha: professional footballer
Surat Sukha: professional footballer
Sinthaweechai Hathairattanakool: professional footballer
Poonsawat Kratingdaenggym: a world-class professional boxer

See also
Khit cloth

Gallery

References

External links 

 Provincial page from the Tourist Authority of Thailand

 Website of province (Thai only)

 
Provinces of Thailand